Nelson Cricket Club, based at Seedhill in Nelson, Lancashire, are a cricket club in the Lancashire League. They play at the Seedhill ground in Nelson. Their captain for the 2016 season is Neil Thompson and their professional is Ryan Bailey.

Nelson Cricket Club was formed in 1861 when two other local clubs merged. It was a founding member of the Lancashire League in 1892, winning the inaugural championship. The club has gone on to win the league on 21 occasions, the most of any club. During this period the club has fielded prominent cricketers such as Learie Constantine, Kapil Dev and Steve Waugh.

Honours

1st XI League Winners - 21 - 1892, 1895, 1896, 1903, 1911, 1928, 1929, 1931, 1932, 1934, 1935, 1936, 1937, 1946, 1965, 1967, 1969, 1986, 1994, 1998, 1999
Worsley Cup Winners - 9 - 1920, 1926, 1928, 1931, 1934, 1962, 1965, 1995, 2006
Ron Singleton Colne Trophy - 1 - 2000 (shared)
2nd XI League Winners - 15 - 1896, 1909, 1911, 1925 (shared), 1928, 1932, 1956, 1957, 1958, 1990, 1996, 2008, 2009, 2011, 2014
2nd XI (Lancashire Telegraph) Cup Winners - 4 - 1994, 2008, 2009, 2013
3rd XI League Winners - 4 - 2003, 2007, 2009, 2013
Highest 50 overs score - 336-4 v Colne at Nelson on 25 May 2008

See also
List of Nelson Cricket Club professionals

References

External links
Nelson Cricket Club Website
Nelson CC at lancashireleague.com

Lancashire League cricket clubs
Sport in the Borough of Pendle
1861 establishments in England
Nelson, Lancashire
Cricket clubs established in 1861